Indira Ranamagar is a Nepalese politician and social worker, currently serving as the Deputy Speaker of the House of Representatives of Nepal as of 21 January 2023. In 2022, she was elected to the 2nd Federal Parliament of Nepal from Rastriya Swatantra Party based on proportional representation category.

Early life and career
Upto the age of ten, she had to struggle for her early schooling, however she managed to get admission later and graduated from a local school. After the graduation, she worked as a teacher and eventually moved to Kathmandu. There she got influenced by the works of Parijat on the rights of political prisoners. Ranamagar joined Parijat's movement and got acquainted with the Nepalese justice system and the poor conditions in prisons.

Work with Prisoners Assistance Nepal
Ranamagar founded a non-profit organization Prisoners Assistance Nepal in 2000 which assists the children of parents serving sentence in jails. The organization has constructed four children's homes, two schools, and implemented social projects aimed to help prisoners and their children.

Political Career
Indira Ranamagar was nominated as a Member of 2nd Federal Parliament of Nepal from  Indigenous peoples category by Rastriya Swatantra Party, following the 2022 Nepalese general election.

Indira Ranamagar was elected as the third Deputy Speaker of the  Parliament on January 21, 2023. She received a total of 166 votes out of the 264 members present in the House.

Awards and recognitions
For her work, Ranamagar has been recognized by various national and international organizations. Some of the major awards she received are:
 Asia 21 Young Leader Public Service Award in 2009.
 World Children’s Honorary Award from the Queen Silvia of Sweden in 2014.
 Nomination for World's Children's Prize in 2014. 
 Listed in the BBC's 100 Women in 2017.

References

Nepalese social workers
Living people
BBC 100 Women
Nepal MPs 2022–present
1970 births